Primm Valley Casino Resorts (formerly known as Primadonna Casino Resorts) is a group of three hotel-casinos in Primm, Nevada, along Interstate 15 at the California state line. They are owned and operated by Affinity Gaming. It is named after the Primm family, benefactors of the hotel and casino properties by Ernest and Gary Primm.

The hotels are a popular stop on the drive between Las Vegas and California.

The various hotels are connected across I-15 by both a monorail and a defunct amusement train line that was connected with Buffalo Bill's and Whiskey Pete's.

History

The hotels were built by Gary Primm and the Primm family at State Line, Nevada, the informal name for the area. The family's history in the area is the reason why it received the official name of Primm.

Whiskey Pete's was the first of their hotels. The Primadonna Resort was the second hotel built, and it was later renamed as the Primm Valley Resort. These two hotels were connected by a single-car monorail that rain across the I-15. 

Buffalo Bill's was the third hotel built. Buffalo Bill's and Primm Valley Resort were connected by a monorail.

The company acquired an option to buy an 18-acre site on the Las Vegas Strip. 
Gary Primm of Primadonna Resorts approached MGM Grand Inc. president Bob Maxey in 1994 with an idea for the site: a casino recreating the New York skyline. A joint venture was formed between the two companies, and construction began in March 1995. Completed at a cost of $460 million, the New York-New York Hotel and Casino opened in January 1997.

The Las Vegas Outlet Mall was added as a part of the Primadonna Resort in 1998.

On March 1, 1999, MGM Grand Inc. acquired Primadonna Resorts in an all-stock transaction that had been announced on November 9, 1998.

Since the initiation of New York-New York, analysts had speculated that MGM Grand or Primadonna would buy out the other's interest in the project. Instead of making such a cash-intensive purchase, however, MGM agreed to buy Primadonna outright for $276 million in stock plus $336 million in assumed debt. The merger closed in March 1999, giving MGM ownership of three casinos and two golf courses at the Nevada–California state line, in addition to full control of New York-New York.

On October 31, 2006, MGM announced plans to sell Primm Valley Resorts to Herbst Gaming for $400 million. The proposed sale would not include the Primm Valley Golf Club. The sale closed on April 10, 2007.

Operations
 Buffalo Bill's
 Fashion Outlets of Las Vegas
 Primm Valley Resort & Casino
 Star of the Desert Arena
 Whiskey Pete's
 Several gas stations and convenience stores that surround the casinos and the lottery and convenience store located on a portion of the property in California.

Former
Primm Valley Golf Club
New York-New York Hotel and Casino (50% with MGM Grand Inc.)

References

External links
 

Gambling companies of the United States
Hospitality companies of the United States
Affinity Gaming